Kulamagal Radhai is a 1963 Indian Tamil-language romance film directed and written by A. P. Nagarajan. It is based on the novel Vaazhvu Engey by Akilan. The film stars Sivaji Ganesan, B. Saroja Devi and Devika. It was released on 7 June 1963.

Plot 
Radhai is in love with Chandran and they decide to get married. While trying to elope, Radhai's sister-in-law Vanaja stops Radhai and convinces her not to elope, which makes Chandran feel betrayed.

Cast 
Sivaji Ganesan as Chandran
B. Saroja Devi as Radhai
Devika as Leela

Supporting actors
R. S. Manohar as Natarajan
K. Sarangapani as Sambhamoorthy
V. K. Ramasamy as Leela's father
T. K. Bhagavathi as Sundaresan
T. N. Sivadhaanu as Aarumugam
P. D. Sambandam as a circus man

Supporting actresses
P. Kannamba as Kamalam
R. Sandhya as Vanaja
Manorama as Muthamma

Production 
Kulamagal Radhai directed by A. P. Nagarajan who also wrote the screenplay, and was produced by Spider Films. It is based on the novel Vaazhvu Engey, by Akilan. Cinematography was handled by W. R. Subba Rao, and the editing by K. Durairaj.

Soundtrack 
The music was composed by K. V. Mahadevan. Lyrics were written by Kannadasan and A. Maruthakasi.

Release and reception 
Kulamagal Radhai was released on 7 June 1963. In Sport and Pastime, T. M. Ramachandran called the film "above average", praising Nagarajan's direction, the cast performances and the music but criticising Nagarajan for having made compromises to make the film commercially viable.

References

External links 
 

1960s romance films
1960s Tamil-language films
1963 films
Circus films
Films based on Indian novels
Films directed by A. P. Nagarajan
Films scored by K. V. Mahadevan
Films set in 1963
Films set in Chennai
Films with screenplays by A. P. Nagarajan
Indian black-and-white films
Indian romance films